The Torrey pine (Pinus torreyana) is a rare pine species in California, United States. It is a critically endangered species growing only in coastal San Diego County, and on Santa Rosa Island, offshore from Santa Barbara in Santa Barbara County. The Torrey pine is endemic to the California coastal sage and chaparral ecoregion.

Taxonomy
The species epithet torreyana is named for John Torrey, an American botanist, after whom the coniferous genus Torreya is also named.

Description
Like all pines, its needles are clustered into 'fascicles' that have a particular number of needles for each pine species; in the Torrey pine there are five needles in each fascicle. Like all pines, it has strobili, structures that function as a flower but look like a small cone, which for the Torrey pine look like a yellow bud in a male strobilus and like a small red cone in a female.

Torrey pines are sometimes afflicted with witch's broom (or "gorilla's nest"), an unusually dense cluster of needles that looks somewhat like a bird's nest, caused by disease or other causes.

There are two subspecies or varieties. These are said to be distinguished by the following characteristics, as well as possibly differing in the terpenoid (beta-phellandrene, limonene, cineole, etc.) profile.

Distribution
The extant population of Pinus torreyana is restricted to trees growing in a narrow strip along the Southern California coast in San Diego. There is also a population of the variety Pinus torreyana var. insularis in two groves on Santa Rosa Island, a California Channel Island off the coast of Santa Barbara. The presence of Torrey pines along the semi-arid coast of San Diego and Santa Rosa Island (rainfall less than 15 inches per year) is probably a relict population of a much more extensive Ice Age distribution. Coastal fog during spring and summer along the San Diego and Santa Rosa Island coast provides just enough moisture to supplement the fairly low winter rainfall, allowing for survival of the species in the wild habitat zone.

Ecology
The native habitat of Pinus torreyana is coastal sage scrub, a plant community, growing slowly in dry, sandy soil. The root system is extensive. A tiny seedling may quickly send a taproot down  seeking moisture and nutrients. A mature tree may have roots extending .

The seeds are eaten by birds and rodents. Like most pine tree species, the seeds have a wing attached to them, but in this species it is papery, breaks off easily, and is entirely non-functional, so this tree is entirely reliant upon animals to disperse its seeds. The scrub jay (Aphelocoma californica) is the most important species when it comes to dispersal of the seeds (on the mainland). Scrub jays and perhaps also squirrels are thought to be spreading the species into adjacent parklands from gardens around San Diego.

The caterpillars of the moth Gloveria arizonensis have been confirmed to feed on this tree in the wild.

Stratification, which is the process of subjecting seeds to (moist) cold, encourages germination in Torrey pine seeds

Uses

Food
The pine nuts were once eaten by the Kumeyaay tribe of Native American people.

Cultivation
Although considered endangered in the wild, Torrey pine is often planted as an ornamental tree around San Diego, coastal and inland southern California, and even the Central Valley. A single tree planted in a suburb of San Diego in the 1940s or 1950s has grown tall and straight, and to a large size, . It is sold by at least ten different plant nurseries in California as of 2020.

Forestry
Pinus torreyana has been considered as a plantation tree for forestry use in Australia, New Zealand and Kenya.

Culture
In San Diego County it is considered a local icon, where it lends its name to Torrey Pines State Reserve, Torrey Pines State Beach, Torrey Pines Golf Course, Torrey Pines High School, and Torrey Pines Gliderport, as well as numerous local roads and businesses (e.g., Torrey Pines Bank, Torrey Pines Property Management Company, Torrey Pines Landscape Company, and Torrey Pines Law Group.)

Conservation
There is some disagreement about the total population of Pinus torreyana. In general, only the populations in Torrey Pines State Reserve (TPSR) and on Santa Rosa Island are deemed to count as the wild population, not the trees planted around San Diego and wider California. In the 1970s it was estimated that the population in the TPSR and on Santa Rosa Island was about 9,000 individuals, but many of these trees have since died due to forest fires, drought and a series of infestations of a bark beetle, as well as being stressed by air pollution. There were only a hundred trees surviving in the early 20th century. As of 2016 it is thought by the California Native Plant Society that the population of this species is some 3,000 individuals. In 2011, Aljos Farjon, assessing the conservation status of this species for the IUCN, estimated that the total population of P. torreyana was now 4,500 individuals. He states that there is a slow decline of the numbers, especially of the trees not found within the TPSR on the mainland.

The Torrey pine is protected by a city tree ordinance in Del Mar, near the native habitat, and construction projects and citizens require a permit for its removal.

Gallery

References

External links

 USDA PLANTS entry
 USDA Plants Profile: Pinus torreyana
 Torrey Pines State Reserve
 Calscape, California Native Plant Society: Torrey Pine (Pinus torreyana)
 Jepson Manual Treatment: Pinus torreyana
  Pinus torreyana Photo gallery

Pinus
Pinus taxa by common names
Endemic flora of California
Trees of the Southwestern United States
Natural history of the California chaparral and woodlands
Natural history of the Channel Islands of California
Natural history of San Diego County, California
Taxa named by Charles Christopher Parry
Taxa named by Élie-Abel Carrière
Edible nuts and seeds
Trees of Mediterranean climate